This page shows the results of the Synchronized Swimming Competition at the 2003 Pan American Games, held from August 1 to August 17, 2003 in Santo Domingo, Dominican Republic. There were just two medal events after the exclusion of the Women's Solo Competition.

Duet

Team

Medal table

References
 Sports 123
 USA Synchro Results

2003
2003 in synchronized swimming
Events at the 2003 Pan American Games